Petras Balocka (born October 9, 1986) is a Lithuanian basketball player. In his career, Balocka played in Lithuania, Georgia, France, Sweden, Kuwait and currently Austria.

Honors
ÖBL rebounding leader (2014)

References

External links
Profile – Eurobasket.com

1986 births
Living people
BC Rytas players
BSC Fürstenfeld Panthers players
East Tennessee State Buccaneers men's basketball players
Hawaii Rainbow Warriors basketball players
Lithuanian men's basketball players
Lithuanian expatriate basketball people in the United States
Norrköping Dolphins players
Pensacola State Pirates men's basketball players
Power forwards (basketball)
Basketball players from Vilnius